Chen Kerui (born 9 March 1996) is a Chinese footballer who currently plays as a midfielder for Shandong Taishan.

Club career
Chen Kerui would play for the Shandong Luneng (now known as Shandong Taishan) youth team and even be included to the reserve squad called Shandong Youth, who were allowed to take part in the Chinese football pyramid. He would go abroad to Portugal where he made his senior debut for Pinhalnovense on 23 August 2015 in a league game against Lusitano VRSA in a 2-0 defeat. He would return to Shandong where he was soon loaned out to second-tier football club Baoding Yingli ETS in the 2017 China League One season. He would make his debut for them in a league game on 8 July 2017 against Shijiazhuang Ever Bright in a game that ended in a 2-1 defeat. After his loan ended with Baoding he was loaned out once again to Meizhou Hakka for the 2018 China League One season where he made his first appearance for the club in a league game on 10 March 2018 against Shijiazhuang Ever Bright in a 2-1 defeat. This was followed by his first goal on 8 April 2018 in a league game against Nei Mongol Zhongyou in a 3-1 victory.

Chen would return to Shandong for the 2019 Chinese Super League season where he made his debut for the club on 31 March 2019 in a league game against Tianjin Tianhai F.C. in a 4-2 victory. On 18 September 2020 he would score his first goal for the club in a Chinese FA Cup game against Dalian Professional F.C. that ended in a 4-0 victory. To gain more playing time he would be loaned out to top tier Chinese club Tianjin Jinmen Tiger, where he would make his debut in a league game against Shanghai Port on 22 April 2021 in a 6-1 defeat.

Career statistics
.

Honours

Club
Shandong Luneng/ Shandong Taishan
Chinese FA Cup: 2020

References

External links

1996 births
Living people
Chinese footballers
China youth international footballers
Chinese expatriate footballers
Association football midfielders
Campeonato de Portugal (league) players
China League Two players
China League One players
Chinese Super League players
Shandong Taishan F.C. players
C.F. Os Belenenses players
C.D. Pinhalnovense players
Baoding Yingli Yitong players
Meizhou Hakka F.C. players
Expatriate footballers in Portugal
Chinese expatriate sportspeople in Portugal